Save the Ship is a 1923 American silent comedy film starring Stan Laurel.

Cast
 Stan Laurel - Husband
 Marie Mosquini - Wife
 Mark Jones - Father-in-law

See also
 List of American films of 1923

References

External links

1923 films
American silent short films
American black-and-white films
1923 comedy films
1923 short films
Films directed by George Jeske
Silent American comedy films
American comedy short films
1920s American films
1920s English-language films
English-language comedy films